Karl Kälin or Carl Kälin (Einsiedeln, 5 May 1870-Basel, 1 January 1950) was a Swiss Jesuit priest, translator and writer.

Life 
His father was the writer Eduard Kälin.

He was ordained a priest in 1901 and served in several parishes in Switzerland. He was also an editor in the magazine Die katholischen Missionen.

Works 
 In den Zelten des Mahdi, 1904
 Der Sieger aus Futuna, 1926

External links 
DNB

1870 births
1950 deaths
20th-century Swiss Roman Catholic priests
Swiss writers in German
Swiss translators